The Free Edinburgh Fringe Festival is a programme of free entry events that takes place at the Edinburgh Festival Fringe, the world's largest arts festival, each August. It is organised by the comedy promoter Laughing Horse, although it includes shows of different genres, and is one of several "free" festivals taking place in the city at that time, most of which incorporate the words free, fringe and/or festival in their title, often leading to confusion. 

Free Edinburgh Fringe Festival venues are commonly independently run bars and nightclubs which create performance spaces in their premises for the duration of the Fringe Festival. Performers are allocated timeslots for free on the condition that they do not charge audiences an entry fee to watch the show. Although audience members are asked to make voluntary contributions at the end of the shows to help pay the performers expenses.

Generally, Edinburgh Fringe shows are self-financing and the average run at the fringe can cost a performer £5000 in venue hire fees, publicity and accommodation. The aim of The Free Festival is to provide performers and festival goers with a cheaper alternative.

Predominantly the shows are stand up comedy and sketch comedy but in recent years there has been an increase in theatre, cabaret, music, storytelling and children’s shows.

Free Festival programme
The Free Festival promotes comedy, theatre, music, cabaret, opera, musicals, film, children’s shows, events and art displays – programmed by experienced producers in each area. Award winning performers and full runs of shows from the likes of Pappy’s Fun Club, John Gordillo, Lewis Schaffer, Nick Wilty, Sol Bernstein, Steve Day, Bob Slayer, Nik Coppin and Ivor Dembina have appeared in previous years, plus guest appearances in compilation shows from well known performers such as Alan Carr, Scott Capurro, Richard Herring, Brendon Burns, Marcus Brigstocke, Reg D. Hunter, Dan Antopolski and Paul Foot.

Critical acclaim
The Free Festival has received coverage from Sky News, BBC, Culture Show, The Guardian, The Times, The Scotsman, The List, Metro, Chortle and many other local publications. In 2009 75% of Free Festival shows were reviewed 3 star and above, with thirty 4-star and 20 5-star reviews.

2010 facts
In 2010 the Free Festival produced over 300 shows at the fringe.

Imran Yusuf's Free Festival show became the first non-ticketed show at the Edinburgh Festival to be nominated for a main Comedy Award for Best Newcomer

2009 facts
In 2009 there were a total of 2,098 shows at the Edinburgh Festival Fringe and 235 of these (over 11%) were part of the Free Festival making it the largest promoter of free events at the Fringe, and after the Edinburgh Comedy Festival the second largest promoter of Comedy).

 22 stages across 14 Venues
 Venue capacities from 50 to 150
 235 shows (Over 11% of all shows at Edinburgh Fringe)
 3,500 performances (140 per day)
 50,000 Free Festival brochures
 100,000 website visitors (over 500,000 page impressions)
 180,000 free tickets (7,200 per day)
 1,175,000 flyers (average of 5000 per show)

Previous accolades
In 2007 the BBC produced a radio comedy pilot based on Ian Fox's 2006 Free Fringe Show The Butterfly Effect

Free Festival Venues
Edinburgh venues that are part of the Free Edinburgh Fringe Festival:

New Venues in 2010
 The Metropole Cafe (Venue 141)
 The Reverie (Venue 270)
 Three Sisters (venue 272)
 Laughing Horse Online (venue 194)

Other Venues
 The Argyle Bar (venue 353)
 Cafe Renroc (venue 84)
 The City Cafe (venue 85)
 Edinburgh City Football Club (venue 164)
 Espionage (venue 185)
 The Hive (venue 313)
 Jekyll & Hyde (venue 259)
 The Meadow Bar (venue 264)
 The National Museum of Scotland
 The Newsroom (venue 93)
 St. Martins Church

Previous venues
 Berlin
 Ego
 Hillside
 Lindsay's
 Meridian
 The Outhouse
 The Counting House (venue 170)
 The Pear Tree
 The Blind Poet

Free festival history
The Free Festival was set up by Alex Petty of Laughing Horse, who has organised free venues at the Edinburgh Festival Fringe since 2004. It was originally in a partnership with The Free Fringe founded by Peter Buckley Hill but split away from that organisation in 2006.

Heroes of Fringe

In 2011 Bob Slayer, a performer and previous booker for the Free Festival set up independent fringe promoter Heroes of Fringe in a former Free Festival venue: Heroes @ The Hive. The move was amicable and the two organisations maintain a working relationship. In 2013 Heroes added a second venue Heroes @ Bob & Miss Behave's Bookshop. Heroes shows have won three Malcolm Hardee Awards and been nominated for several other awards. In 2013 Adrienne Truscott won the Edinburgh Fringe Awards (formerly the Perrier) panel prize for spirit of the Fringe.

See also
Edinburgh Festival Fringe
Edinburgh Festival
Free Fringe

References

External links
 
 The Laughing Horse
 The Edinburgh Fringe
 How to Produce a Free Festival Show by Ian Fox

Edinburgh Festival
Edinburgh
Comedy festivals in Scotland
Street theatre
Theatre festivals in Scotland
Fringe festivals in the United Kingdom
Edinburgh Festival Fringe